Augustin Fliche (19 November 1884, in Montpellier – 19 November 1951) was a 20th-century French historian who mainly dealt with the history of the Church in the Middle Ages. He was a professor at the University of Montpellier and also visiting professor at the University of Leuven in 1925–1927 and 1946–1947.

He is known among other things for a biography of Philip I of France and another one of Pope Gregory VII with his reforms. He also wrote overviews of the history of the Middle Ages.

From 1935, he directed with Victor Martin a Histoire de l'Église depuis les origines jusqu'à nos jours published by Bloud and Gay.

In 1941, he was elected a member of the Académie des Inscriptions et Belles-Lettres.

He was opposed to both the educational theories of Marc Bloch and Bloch personally, probably, suggests Eugen Weber, due to Fliche's innate antisemitism and the fact that Bloch had once given one of Fliche's pieces a poor review.

Works 
1912: Le Règne de Philippe Ier, roi de France (1060–1108). Paris, Société française d'imprimerie et de librairie, Archive.
1912: Les Vies de Saint Savinien. Premier évêque de Sens : étude critique suivie d'une édition de la plus ancienne vita.
1916: Études sur la polémique religieuse à l'époque de Grégoire VII. Société française d'Imprimerie et de Librairie, Paris Archive.
1920: Saint Grégoire VII. Lecoffre, Archive
1924–1937: La Réforme grégorienne, 3 volumes. Louvain 
1929: La Chrétienté médiévale 395-1254. Histoire du monde, VII/2
1930: L'Europe occidentale de 888 à 1125. Histoire générale. Histoire du moyen âge, II.
1946: with R. Foreville, Jean Rousset : La Réforme grégorienne et la reconquête chrétienne (1057–1123). Histoire de l'église depuis les origines jusqu'à nos jours, Teilband 8. Bloud & Gay, Paris
1946:  La querelle des investitures. Aubier, Éditions Montaigne
1948: with Christine Thouzellier, Yvonne Azais : Du premier concile du Latran à l'avènement d'Innocent III (1123–1198). Histoire de l'église depuis les origines jusqu'à nos jours, Fascicule 9. Bloud & Gay
1950: with Christine Thouzellier, Yvonne Azais : La Chrétienté romaine (1198–1274). Histoire de l'église depuis les origines jusqu'à nos jours, Fascicule 10. Bloud & Gay

Bibliography

External links 
Fliche, Augustin in Encyclopédie Treccani
Entry in IDIH
OPAC, Regesta Imperii

Writers from Montpellier
1884 births
1951 deaths
20th-century French historians
Historians of Christianity
Members of the Académie des Inscriptions et Belles-Lettres
French historians of religion